Cleveland County Sheriff's Office is the chief law enforcement agency in Cleveland County, Oklahoma, with primary jurisdiction in the unincorporated areas of the county. Consisting of over 194 employees including deputies, detention staff and support personnel, the Office serves a population of over 275,000 people. The office is headed by Sheriff Chris Amason, a Republican, elected and taking office in November 2020.

Controversies
 An audit revealed that the department had bartered with vendors using confiscated weapons.
 $85,000 in firearms, radios and police vests went unaccounted for in 2017
 At times they have driven almost 50 vehicles without purchasing insurance.
 They have used county money to house Department of Corrections inmates and failed to bill the DOC almost a quarter million dollars.

Fallen Deputies
Since the establishment of the Cleveland County Sheriff's Office, two deputies have died in the line of duty.

See also

List of law enforcement agencies in Oklahoma

References

External links
 Cleveland County Sheriff

Cleveland County, Oklahoma
Sheriffs' offices of Oklahoma
1889 establishments in Indian Territory